Christian Sauter (born 11 February 1980) is a German politician. Born in Rinteln, Lower Saxony, he represents the Free Democratic Party (FDP). Christian Sauter has served as a member of the Bundestag from the state of North Rhine-Westphalia since 2017.

Life 
Christian Sauter was born in Rinteln in 1980 and grew up in the Extertal, where he still lives today. After passing his Abitur (A-levels) at the Gymnasium Barntrup and completing his military service, he completed his studies in 2006 as a graduate industrial engineer (FH) in the field of logistics and subsequently became active in this field.  He is an active member of the Association of German Armed Forces Reservists. He became member of the bundestag after the 2017 German federal election. He is a member of the Defence Committee.

References

External links 

 Bundestag biography 
 

 

 

1980 births
Living people
Members of the Bundestag for North Rhine-Westphalia
Members of the Bundestag 2017–2021
Members of the Bundestag 2021–2025
Members of the Bundestag for the Free Democratic Party (Germany)